The E-Government Act of 2002 (H.R. 2458/S. 803), is a United States statute enacted on 17 December 2002, with an effective date for most provisions of 17 April 2003.  Its stated purpose is to improve the management and promotion of electronic government services and processes by establishing a Federal Chief Information Officer within the Office of Management and Budget, and by establishing a framework of measures that require using Internet-based information technology to improve citizen access to government information and services, and for other purposes.

The statute includes within it
 FISMA (the Federal Information Security Management Act of 2002) as Title III, and
 CIPSEA (the Confidential Information Protection and Statistical Efficiency Act) as Title V.

Legislative history 
On 27 June 2002, the Act (the Lieberman Bill, or S. 803) passed the U.S. Senate on Unanimous Consent.

House Hearing No. 107-184 on the proposed bill was held on 18 September 2002.

Provisions
 To provide effective leadership of Federal Government efforts to develop and promote electronic Government services and processes by establishing an Administrator of a new Office of Electronic Government within the Office of Management and Budget.
 To promote use of the Internet and other information technologies to provide increased opportunities for citizen participation in Government.
 To promote inter-agency collaboration in providing electronic Government services, where this collaboration would improve the service to citizens by integrating related functions, and in the use of internal electronic Government processes, where this collaboration would improve the efficiency and effectiveness of the processes.
 To improve the ability of the Government to achieve agency missions and program performance goals.
 To promote the use of the Internet and emerging technologies within and across Government agencies to provide citizen-centric Government information and services.
 To reduce costs and burdens for businesses and other Government entities.
 To promote better informed decision making by policy makers.
 To promote access to high quality Government information and services across multiple channels.
 To make the Federal Government more transparent and accountable.
 To transform agency operations by utilizing, where appropriate, best practices from public and private sector organizations.
 To provide enhanced access to Government information and services in a manner consistent with laws regarding protection of personal privacy, national security, records retention, access for persons with disabilities, and other relevant laws.

PACER

Section 205(c)(1) requires the federal judiciary to make  any  document  that  is  filed  electronically  publicly available  online. Section 205(e) amended Section  303(a)  of  the Judiciary  Appropriations  Act, 1992 to read:
The Judicial Conference may, only to the extent necessary, prescribe reasonable fees, pursuant to sections 1913, 1914, 1926, 1930, and 1932 of title 28, United States Code, for collection by the courts under those sections for access to information available through automatic data processing equipment.

In April 2016, three non-profit organizations—the Alliance for Justice, the National Veterans Legal Services Program and the National Consumer Law Center—filed a class-action lawsuit in the U.S. District Court for the District of Columbia, alleging that the judiciary's PACER fee structure violates Section 205(e) in that the fees were not only being used to maintain the system itself, but were being diverted to cover other costs of the federal courts, including courtroom audio systems and flat-screen televisions for jury use. In March 2018, the judge ruled that the PACER fees were impermissibly used to cover unrelated costs.  that holding is under appeal to the Court of Appeals for the Federal Circuit.

See also
 Business.gov 
 Teleadministration

References

External links 
 Full text of Act (pdf)
 E-Government website
 FCW.com: E-gov agenda takes shape

United States federal computing legislation
Acts of the 107th United States Congress
United States federal government administration legislation
E-government in the United States